Allegheny, Pennsylvania may refer to:
 Allegheny City, Pennsylvania, which was annexed by the city of Pittsburgh
 The neighborhood of Allegheny Commons (Pittsburgh)
 The neighborhood of Allegheny Center in Pittsburgh 
 Allegheny County, Pennsylvania
 The neighborhood of Allegheny West (Pittsburgh)
 The neighborhood of East Allegheny (Pittsburgh)
 The neighborhood of Allegheny West, Philadelphia

See also
 Allegheny Township (disambiguation)
 Allegheny (disambiguation)